AUFC may refer to one of the following football clubs:

In America:
 Atlanta United FC

In Australia:
 Adelaide United FC
 Adelaide University Football Club

In England:
 Abingdon United F.C.
 Ardley United F.C.
 Arlesey Athletic F.C.
 Ascot United F.C.
 Ash United F.C.
 Ashford United F.C.
 Ashton United F.C.
 Aylesbury United F.C.

In Myanmar:
 Ayeyawady United F.C.
In Scotland:
 Ayr United F.C.
 Annbank United F.C.
 Aberdeen University F.C.

In Thailand:
 Army United F.C.

In Wales:
 Aberystwyth University F.C.